Waterfalls are formed as water flows over a vertical drop or a series of drops in the course of a stream or river.
There are waterfalls in the Republic of Azerbaijan. Those in the northern regions of Azerbaijan usually freeze in winter.

Laza, Gusar 

Laza waterfall is the most popular waterfall in the village of Laza in Gusar, which is located in the northeast of the Caucasus Mountains, at the bottom of a high mountainous plateau “Shah yaylag” of the highest alps Shahdag 4242 m above sea level. In winter, climbing competitions are held at the frozen waterfalls here.

Afurja, Guba 

About 75 metres in height, Afurdja is located in Guba. The waterfall has been included in the list of natural monuments of the Republic of Azerbaijan and is protected by the state.

Mujug, Gabala 
Mychig waterfall is located in Qabala District. It takes its source from snow and rain waters on Gotur mountain and falls into the Demiraparan River. About 96 metres tall, Mychig waterfall is the highest waterfall in Azerbaijan.

Yeddi gozal, Gabala 
"Yeddi gozal" waterfall is located 4 km far from the center of Gabala city, in the settlement of Vendam of Gabala district. It is located on the edge of the Oghuz-Gabala highway.

Tekdam, Yardimli 
Tekdam waterfall is located in the Yardimli District and attracts many tourists. It is about 34 m tall.

Ilisu, Gakh 
İlisu waterfall with a height of 25m  is located in the Qakh District. One should walk at least half an hour to access the waterfall.

Katekhchay, Balaken 
Katekh waterfall 20 meters high is one of the biggest waterfalls in Azerbaijan which is located in Balakan District.

Waterfalls in Ismayilli District are Galajiq, Burovdal, Chaygovushan, Istisu, Pirbenovshe, and Medrese.

References

External links